Louisiella is a genus of African, Neotropical and tropical plants in the grass family.

 Species
 Louisiella fluitans C.E.Hubb. & J.Léonard - Cameroon, Zaïre, Central African Republic, South Sudan, and Sudan
 Louisiella elephantipes (Nees ex Trin.) Zuloaga - Latin America (from southern Mexico and the Greater Antilles to Uruguay).
 Louisiella paludosa (Roxb.) Landge - India, Southeast Asia up to Australia.

References
 

Panicoideae
Poaceae genera
Grasses of Africa
Grasses of North America
Grasses of South America
Taxa named by Charles Edward Hubbard